Cecidoses minutanus is a moth of the family Cecidosidae. It was described by Juan Brèthes in 1917. It is found in Argentina.

References

Moths described in 1917
Cecidosidae
Taxa named by Juan Brèthes